The Roman Catholic Diocese of Arua is a diocese located in the city of Arua in the Ecclesiastical province of Gulu in Uganda. Following the resignation of Bishop Frederick Drandua, on 19 August 2009, Pope Benedict XVI appointed the Right Reverend Sabino Ocan Odoki, Auxiliary Bishop of the Catholic Archdiocese of Gulu, as Apostolic Administrator of the Diocese of Arua, until a substantive Bishop is appointed. On October 20, 2010 he was named ordinary Bishop.

History
 June 23, 1958: Established as Diocese of Arua from Diocese of Gulu

Bishops
 Bishops of Arua (Roman rite)
 Bishop Angelo Tarantino, M.C.C.I. (1959.02.12 – 1984)
 Bishop Frederick Drandua (1986.05.27 - 2009.08.19)
 Bishop Sabino Ocan Odoki (2010.10.20 - present)

Other priest of this diocese who became bishop
Martin Luluga, appointed auxiliary bishop of Gulu in 1986

Notable people 
Bernardo Sartori, priest and missionary

See also
Catholic Church in Uganda
Arua

External links
 Official Website of the Diocese of Arua
 GCatholic.org
 Catholic Hierarchy

Sources
 Catholic Hierarchy

References

Roman Catholic dioceses in Uganda
Christian organizations established in 1958
Roman Catholic dioceses and prelatures established in the 20th century
Arua District
Arua
1958 establishments in Uganda
Roman Catholic Ecclesiastical Province of Gulu